Savannah Technical College (Savannah Tech) is a public community college in Savannah, Georgia, with additional satellite campuses in the Savannah-Hinesville-Statesboro Combined Statistical Area.

Academics
Savannah Technical College is accredited by the Commission on Colleges of the Southern Association of Colleges and Schools and the Learning Enrichment Center (LEC) is certified by the College Reading and Learning Association (CRLA).

Savannah Technical College offers certificate, diploma, and associate degree programs in five academic divisions (Health Sciences, Business and Technology, Public Services, Industrial Technology, and Aviation Technology). It is governed by Technical College System of Georgia. The College also offers free Adult Education/ESL programs as well as industry-specific non-credit programs in the four-county service area of Bryan, Chatham, Effingham, and Liberty counties.

Dr. Kathy S. Love is President of Savannah Technical College.  She has served as President since her appointment in January 2009.  Prior to her appointment, she served as President of Flint River Technical College.

Campuses
Savannah Tech operates campuses in Chatham County (the main campus on White Bluff Road and the Crossroads Technology Campus), Liberty County campus (Hinesville) and an Effingham County campus.
The College also has a presence in the Ft. Stewart Army Education Center.

Gallery

References

External links
Official website

Universities and colleges in Savannah, Georgia
Technological universities in the United States
Universities and colleges accredited by the Southern Association of Colleges and Schools
Educational institutions established in 1929
Technical College System of Georgia
1929 establishments in Georgia (U.S. state)